My Buddy (simplified Chinese: 难兄烂弟) is a Singaporean Chinese drama which was telecasted on Singapore's free-to-air channel, MediaCorp Channel 8. It made its debut on 8 July 2009 and ended on 4 August 2009. This drama serial consists of 20 episodes, and was screened on every weekday night at 9:00 pm. The drama is produced by Matrix Vision Productions. This drama serial was retelecast on every weekday except Thursday & Friday at 3.30 pm.

Cast

Main cast

Supporting Cast

Synopsis
Zeng You Quan, (Paul Chan) aged 40, is a single and an honest man and works in an air-con company as a supervisor. His mother died early and his irresponsible father suddenly went missing. Being the eldest in the family, You Quan had to take care of his two sisters.

His sister, Zhi Ling, is already 35 and still single. Zhi Ling is unsociable and stingy, thus You Quan is worried that she will remain single. Hence, he is always trying to matchmake Zhi Ling but is always unsuccessful. Unknown to him, Zhi Ling is actually secretly in love with a guy.

The youngest sister, Zhi Mei, aged 26 is a university graduate. In order to let her pursue her studies in University, You Quan took loans from banks. However, after graduating, Zhi Mei does not take her job seriously and is always changing jobs. Obsessed with her material needs, she often asks You Quan for money.

You Quan have a buddy, so-called ‘Brother’, Tan Ying Bang (Pound) aged 39. They grew up together in the kampong. When You Quan’s mother was seriously ill, Ying Bang accompanied him to search for his father and got hit on the head by You Quan’s father. You Quan feels guilty over this incident. Since then, whenever Ying Bang gets into trouble, You Quan will go all the way out to help him.
 
Although Ying Bang is married, he still womanizes and is not down to earth. He is always thinking of earning easy money and will resort to all means. His sister, Tan Mei Jin (US dollar) aged 33 is ugly but has a kind and pure heart. She runs a stall in the market selling bras with her sister-in-law. Mei Jin likes You Quan since young and will always try to get close to him.

However, You Quan only treats Mei Jin as a sister and though he is not able to endure her entanglements, he cannot bear to reject her. You Quan though has someone in mind, Lee Ru Yi, aged 35, his boss’ daughter. 8 years ago, when Ru Yi got married, You Quan was heartbroken and got drunk. When he woke up and found Mei Jin in bed besides him, he feels extremely guilty. It is this guilt that drives You Quan to always help Ying Bang and Mei Jin.

One day, You Quan receives a call from his sister asking him to rush home immediately as an unknown woman appeared at their house. You Quan find out later that this woman is their stepmother, Ye Pei Yi, aged 38. Upon receiving news that their father died, the children felt no sadness as for so many years, he had not been with them.

Pei Yi showed them their father’s will. Their father had willed half his share of his flat to  Pei Yi. They immediately rejected her intruding into their house. Despite their rejection, she demanded for half of the money for the house since they do not want her to live in the house. In the end, they let her stay on as they could not fork out the huge sum at that point of time. From then on, You Quan has to put up with the 3 women in the house.

Mei Jin thought that Pei Yi is You Quan’s woman thus resulting in a lot of misunderstanding. She even had a fight with Pei Yi at the market. After the misunderstanding has been cleared up, she suddenly changes her attitude towards Pei Yi and they become best friends. When Mei Jin knows that Pei Yi is preparing to go back to sing at the 7th month getai, she heartily arranged You Quan’s boss, Lee Ji Xiang to meet Pei Yi. Surprisingly, Ji Xiang has a liking for Pei Yi and tries to get close to her.

You Quan’s dream lover, Ru Yi divorced and returns to Singapore with her 6 years old  daughter. Although You Quan is happy to see Ru Yi, he still feels inferior and dare not reveals his feelings for her. Meanwhile, You Quan finds out that Zhi Ling is secretly in love with Ying Bang for many years. When Ying Bang’s wife finds out about it, she goes into shock and suffers a miscarriage.

After Zhi Ling’s secret is out, she feels ashamed and her personality changes from a little darling to a rebellious one. She turns to an old man enough to become her father for love.
You Quan introduces Ying Bang to work in his company. However, Ying Bang is not a conscientious worker and even commits corporate espionage. When discovered, he makes You Quan a scapegoat and caused You Quan to be fired by Ru Yi. When Mei Jing learns the truth, she tells Ru Yi. She immediately fires Ying Bang and asks You Quan to go back to her company but is turned down by him. You Quan decided to start a business with Ying Bang. They become successful after much hardship.

When You Quan realises Ru Yi’s company is facing a crisis, he lends a helping hand. Can You Quan win over Ru Yi’s heart? Will Ying Bang turns over a new leaf?

External links
 Theme Song

Singapore Chinese dramas
2009 Singaporean television series debuts
2009 Singaporean television series endings
Channel 8 (Singapore) original programming